Lockridge is a suburb of Perth, in the Bassendean division of Western Australia, and the City of Swan local government area. 

Land was first granted in the area to Edward Hamersley in 1837. Its name is derived from that of Lockeridge House, a property built by his son, Samuel Hamersley, in 1874. Part of what is now Lockridge, which became the Pyrton Estate, was bought by the Western Australian government during the Soldier settlement scheme in the 1920s. In 1969, the State Housing Commission purchased  to begin residential development in the area. An urban renewal project was undertaken in the late 1990s.

At the 2016 Australian census the suburb had a population of 3,467.

Local amenities include Rosher Park, Kiara College, Lockridge Primary School, and the Alice Daveron Community Centre. The Swan Valley Nyungah Community was in the area.

References

Suburbs of Perth, Western Australia
Suburbs and localities in the City of Swan